The 2005–06 NBA season was the 60th season of the National Basketball Association. The Miami Heat defeated the Dallas Mavericks in the NBA Finals, four games to two to win their first NBA championship.

Notable occurrences 

 A new league dress code was put into effect at the beginning of the year by commissioner David Stern.
 The Miami Heat win their first NBA championship in franchise history. They become the third franchise (joining the 1969 Boston Celtics and 1977 Portland Trail Blazers, later joined by the 2016 Cleveland Cavaliers and 2021 Milwaukee Bucks) to win the NBA Finals after losing the first two games. They are also the first of the four (two?) 1988/89 expansion franchises to win a championship.
 The All-Star Game was played on February 19, 2006 at the Toyota Center in Houston with the East beating the West 122–120.  LeBron James of the Cleveland Cavaliers won the game's MVP honors the youngest ever in All-Star Game history at 21 years, and 51 days old.
 This season marked the first season for the Charlotte Bobcats in their new arena in downtown Charlotte.
 Due to the damages caused by Hurricane Katrina, the New Orleans Hornets played 36 regular season games in the Ford Center in Oklahoma City, 1 game in the Lloyd Noble Center in Norman, Oklahoma, 1 game at LSU's Pete Maravich Assembly Center, and just 3 games at the New Orleans Arena in New Orleans in March. Due to the split, the team was officially referred to as the New Orleans/Oklahoma City Hornets.
 This season marked the first under the NBA's new Collective Bargaining Agreement, agreed upon by the owners and the player union on June 21.
 The season was marked by the 30th anniversary of the absorption of four American Basketball Association members into the league: The Indiana Pacers, the New Jersey Nets, the Denver Nuggets and the San Antonio Spurs all joined in 1976.
 On January 22, 2006, Los Angeles Lakers guard Kobe Bryant scored 81 points in a game against the Toronto Raptors.  This was the second-highest single game scoring total in league history, second only to Wilt Chamberlain's 100-point game in 1962.
 Scottie Pippen (Bulls), Karl Malone (Jazz), and Reggie Miller (Pacers) had their numbers retired by their respective franchises.
 The NBA held the Hardwood Classics program for the fifth straight season.  The Bulls, Rockets, Clippers, Grizzlies, Heat, Nets, Knicks, Magic, Suns, Sonics, and Wizards all took part by wearing throwback jerseys for select games.
 On the last day of the regular season, Ray Allen broke the single season record for most three-pointers, at 269.
 The NBA Finals was jokingly referred to as the "American Airlines" series since both competing teams played in an arena sponsored by the same airline. The Miami Heat play their games at American Airlines Arena (now as Miami-Dade Arena), while the Dallas Mavericks reside in the American Airlines Center.
 All five teams in the Central Division made the playoffs, marking the first time all teams in a division made the playoffs since the entire Midwest Division made it 20 years before.
 The Los Angeles Clippers made it back to the playoffs for the first time since 1997 and won their first playoff series since 1976 when they were still known as the Buffalo Braves.
 The Los Angeles Lakers and Minnesota Timberwolves sport a patch in their warmups in memory of Hall of Fame player George Mikan, who died June 1, 2005 at the age of 80.
 On June 20, 2006, the Miami Heat clinched the NBA Finals, with Wade being the Finals MVP, averaging the third highest points per game in finals history, at 34.7, the highest points per a four-game stretch in finals history, at 39.3, and the highest PER in finals history, at 33.8.
This marks the last season that Reebok as the official outfitter for the league until the merged with Adidas, following the season and would continued for the next ten years before Nike became the official outfitter in 2017.
This also marks the last season for longtime Boston Celtics legend Red Auerbach's official involvement as their longtime executive before he died in October 2006.

Coaching changes

2005–06 NBA changes
Boston Celtics – added new green and black road alternate uniforms with black side panels to their jerseys and shorts, and they also added another new green and gold road alternate uniforms with gold side panels to their jerseys and shorts for Saint Patrick's day games only.
Charlotte Bobcats – moved into their new arena the Charlotte Bobcats Arena, (now as Spectrum Center).
Cleveland Cavaliers – added new dark blue road alternate uniforms added side panels to their jerseys and shorts.
Denver Nuggets – added new dark blue road alternate uniforms with light blue side panels to their jerseys and shorts.
Detroit Pistons – added new logo and new uniforms, added new red road alternate uniforms with blue side panels to their jerseys and shorts.
Indiana Pacers – added new logo and new uniforms, remained with dark navy blue and gold to their color scheme and pinstripes was used during the preseason games was eventually removed to their jerseys and shorts at the start of the season.
New Orleans/Oklahoma City Hornets – relocation from New Orleans, Louisiana to Oklahoma City, Oklahoma due to temporary move to Oklahoma City in the aftermath of the destruction of Hurricane Katrina added new logo and uniforms and split home games in New Orleans and Oklahoma City during the season.
Sacramento Kings – added new gold road alternate uniforms with purple, grey and silver side panels to their jerseys and shorts.

Final standings

By division

Eastern Conference

Western Conference

By conference

Notes
z – Clinched home court advantage for the entire playoffs
c – Clinched home court advantage for the conference playoffs
x – Clinched playoff spot
y – Clinched division title

Playoffs
Teams in bold advanced to the next round. The numbers to the left of each team indicate the team's seeding in its conference, and the numbers to the right indicate the number of games the team won in that round. The division champions are marked by an asterisk. Home court advantage does not necessarily belong to the higher-seeded team, but instead the team with the better regular season record; teams enjoying the home advantage are shown in italics.

Statistics leaders

Awards

Yearly awards
Most Valuable Player: Steve Nash, Phoenix Suns
Defensive Player of the Year: Ben Wallace, Detroit Pistons
Rookie of the Year: Chris Paul, New Orleans/Oklahoma City Hornets 
Sixth Man of the Year: Mike Miller, Memphis Grizzlies
Most Improved Player: Boris Diaw, Phoenix Suns
Coach of the Year: Avery Johnson, Dallas Mavericks
Executive of the Year: Elgin Baylor, Los Angeles Clippers
Sportsmanship Award: Elton Brand, Los Angeles Clippers

All-NBA First Team:
F LeBron James – Cleveland Cavaliers
F Dirk Nowitzki – Dallas Mavericks
C Shaquille O'Neal – Miami Heat
G Kobe Bryant – Los Angeles Lakers
G Steve Nash – Phoenix Suns
NBA All-Defensive First Team:
Bruce Bowen – San Antonio Spurs
Ben Wallace – Detroit Pistons
Andrei Kirilenko – Utah Jazz
Ron Artest – Sacramento Kings
Kobe Bryant – Los Angeles Lakers
Jason Kidd – New Jersey Nets
NBA All-Rookie First Team:
Chris Paul – New Orleans/Oklahoma City Hornets
Charlie Villanueva – Toronto Raptors
Andrew Bogut – Milwaukee Bucks
Deron Williams – Utah Jazz
Channing Frye – New York Knicks

All-NBA Second Team:
F Elton Brand – Los Angeles Clippers
F Tim Duncan – San Antonio Spurs 
C Ben Wallace – Detroit Pistons
G Dwyane Wade – Miami Heat
G Chauncey Billups – Detroit Pistons
NBA All-Defensive Second Team:
Tim Duncan – San Antonio Spurs
Chauncey Billups – Detroit Pistons
Kevin Garnett – Minnesota Timberwolves
Marcus Camby – Denver Nuggets
Tayshaun Prince – Detroit Pistons
NBA All-Rookie Second Team:
Danny Granger – Indiana Pacers
Raymond Felton – Charlotte Bobcats
Luther Head – Houston Rockets
Marvin Williams – Atlanta Hawks
Ryan Gomes – Boston Celtics

All-NBA Third Team:
F Shawn Marion – Phoenix Suns
F Carmelo Anthony – Denver Nuggets
C Yao Ming – Houston Rockets
G Allen Iverson – Philadelphia 76ers
G Gilbert Arenas – Washington Wizards

Players of the month
The following players were named the Eastern and Western Conference Players of the Month.

Rookies of the month
The following players were named the Eastern and Western Conference Rookies of the Month.

References

 
NBA
2005–06 in Canadian basketball